Pollibetta is a small village in Kodagu district of Karnataka state, India.

Location
Pollibetta is a small beautiful town in the southern part of Kodagu District. This town comes under Virajapet Taluq. located between Gonikoppal,Siddapura and Ammathi towns. The distance to Gonikoppa is 9.4 kilometers, the distance to Ammathi is 8.8 km, the distance to Siddapura is 11 kilometers and distance to Virajpet is 27.8 km.

Post office
There is a post office in Polibetta village.  The pincode is 571215.

History
A British company called Pollibetta Coffee Estates Company Limited, London managed by Matheson and Company started a tea company in Pollibetta in 1943.  In 1960, the company sold the shares to Indian public.  In 1966, the company was renamed Consolidated Coffee Limited.  Tata Tea Limited acquired the company in 1992.  In 2000, the company was renamed Tata Coffee Limited.

References

Education Institutions
Government Schools: Government Model Primary School and Namma High School.
Private School: Lourdes Hill Convent School Mekur Hosakeri

Hindu Temples
Ganesh Temple: Situated on Siddahpur road, Mekur Hosakeri.
Sri Muthappan Temple: Situated in heart of the pollibetta town, this temple is situated in Private property.

Villages in Kodagu district